Serik is a town and district in Antalya Province of Turkey,  east of the city of Antalya, along the Mediterranean coast.

Geography
Towards the coast the district is mainly flat farmland, used for growing vegetables, while the inland half of Serik is forested hills and the Taurus Mountains. The district has a typical Mediterranean climate of hot, dry summers and warm, wet winters, and the natural vegetation is dry shrubs.

Serik itself is a town of 56,824 people as for 2012. The city of Antalya is nearby limiting the potential for retailing and commerce in Serik, but there is some light industry. There is a well-known köfte and piyaz restaurant in the town centre; the piyaz is served with a sesame (tahini) sauce.

Although wealthy and only 15 km from the wild amenities on the coast, the people of Serik are typically welcoming and traditional in outlook. The population includes many who still identify themselves as Yörük or Turkmen, descendants of the nomadic people that populated the area during the Ottoman Empire and before. These are close-knit communities shunning outside influence and new immigration, prompting some Turkish people to give it the nickname Capital of a Yörük Republic, an echo of the vivaciously preserved traditions and lifestyle. Although the district has seen a large influx of migrant workers in agriculture and tourism most business in the town is still very much in the hands of these original Turkmen people. They defend their interests fervently and Serik municipality is controlled by the Turkish nationalist Nationalist Movement Party (MHP).

Tourism
With  of coastline including the busy resort town of Belek the district of Serik is a major centre of Turkey's tourism industry, attracting 30 million visitors each year. Belek has over fifty 5 star hotels and golf courses. Places of interest include the ruins of Sillyon and Aspendos, the cave of  Zeytinlitaş and Uçansu waterfall.

The 2015 G20 Antalya summit was held in Serik, Antalya.

Agriculture 
Many fruits and vegetables are grown in the region, especially bananas. Blueberries are among the important agricultural products of Serik.

Villages and towns

History
Two important cities here in antiquity were Sillion, a colony of the Kingdom of Pergamon, and Aspendos, one of the most important Greek Pamphylian cities. Aspendos is situated on the point where the Kopru River meets the sea. Once an important port and a commercial centre, it had a reputation for raising the best horses on earth. The odeon, basilica, galleria and fountains are worth seeing.

The area was named Serik after a Turkish tribe that settled here, one of many waves of Turkish settlers attracted to this coast throughout history.

References

External links 

 Kadriye.info Turkey's Premier Golf Resort with Beach Park in Serik, Antalya
 Information on Serik
 Serik-Belek-Kadriye NetGuide

Antalya
Towns in Turkey
Populated places in Antalya Province
Serik District
Districts of Antalya Province